The 2008–09 season was Klubi i Futbollit Tirana's 70th competitive season, 70th consecutive season in the Kategoria Superiore and 88th year in existence as a football club.

Season overview
In October 2008, Tirana won the inaugural Taçi Oil Cup by beating then-FIFA Club World Cup winners Milan 2–1 with goals scored by Daniel Xhafaj and Muzaka. Later on 10 December, manager Blaz Sliskovic was sacked by president Refik Halili after collecting only one win in the last seven league matches. He was replaced by club legend Agustin Kola who led the team until May of the following year.

Tirana won their 24th championship in history on 23 May 2009 by winning 2–1 at home against Vllaznia Shkodër in the final matchday. In cup, the team reached the final once again, this time losing to Flamurtari Vlorë at Niko Dovana Stadium. The leading figure of Tirana in this season was the striker Migen Memelli brought on loan from Sweden's GAIS, who scored an impressive 22 league goals and won the Golden Boot for the first time in his career. Memelli with Tirana also set the record for the fastest goal ever scored in the Kategoria Superiore when he netted inside 7 seconds in the 2–1 win at Flamurtari Vlorë on 5 April.

Kit

Supplier: Puma
Sponsor: Volkswagen Classic

Other information

Current squad
As of May 2009  players in bold have a least one cap for an international team

Captain Hierarchy
  Devis Mukaj
  Blendi Nallbani

Transfers

In

Summer

Winter

Out

Summer

Winter

Starting 11

Pre-season and friendlies

Taçi Oil Cup

Competitions

Overview

Kategoria Superiore

League table

Results summary

Results by round

Matches

Albanian Cup

First round

Second round

Quarter-finals

Semi-finals

Final

Statistics

Goalscorers

Last updated: 23 May 2009

References

External links
Official website

2008-09
Tirana
Albanian football championship-winning seasons